Robert Stanley Richards (31 May 1885 – 24 April 1967) was an Australian politician who served as the 32nd Premier of South Australia, representing the South Australian Branch of the Australian Labor Party.

Early life
Born in Moonta Mines, South Australia, the youngest of twelve children to Cornish miner Richard Richards and his wife Mary, Richards was locally educated before leaving school at age 13 to work in the Moonta mines, initially in menial jobs and later as a carpenter. In his early twenties Richards moved to Burnie, Tasmania to manage a copper mine before returning to Moonta, where he married Ada Dixon on 31 January 1914.

Politics
Richards became involved with the labour movement and was elected vice-president of the Federated Mining Employees Association in 1916. When that union merged into the Australian Workers' Union in 1917, he became president of the AWU's mining section, proving himself to be a forceful and competent leader. A lay Methodist preacher, Freemason and keen cricketer and Australian rules footballer, Richards was a popular and well known local identity and it came as no surprise when he sought Labor preselection.

Elected to the Electoral district of Wallaroo (which covered Moonta) in the South Australian House of Assembly at the 1918 election, Richards quickly gained a reputation in parliament for his leadership and debating abilities and following Labor's victory at the 1924 election, Richards was named Chairman of Committees, firstly in the John Gunn led government and, following Gunn's resignation, in Lionel Hill's cabinet.

Ousted from government at the 1927 election by the Richard Layton Butler led Liberal Federation, South Australia first enjoyed the boom of the 1920s and then suffered the onset of the Great Depression in Australia. The 1930 election was highlighted by Butler's warning to voters that the Depression would worsen before it improved and Labor leader Hill's promise of a master plan to solve the problems of the Depression. Labor was swept to power and Richards appointed to the positions of Commissioner of Crown Lands, Minister of Mines and Marine and Minister of Labour and Employment.

Unfortunately, Labor did not have a master strategy to combat the Depression, and was instead forced to institute wage cuts and sweeping retrenchments in the public service as part of implementing the frugal measures of the 1931 Premiers' Plan enacted to fight the Depression. The Premier's Plan saw widespread discontent in South Australia, particularly within traditional working-class Labor supporters, resulting in the ALP state executive expelling 23 of the 30 members of the parliamentary caucus—including Richards and the entire cabinet—from the Labor Party later in 1931. The 23 expelled MPs formed the Parliamentary Labor Party (also known as Premiers Plan Labor), which stayed in office with the support of the conservative opposition.

The Hill Cabinet remained precariously in power until February 1933, when Hill happily resigned as Premier nine weeks before the 1933 election to move to London as Australian Agent-General. Richards reluctantly succeeded Hill as Premier and Treasurer of South Australia. Without public or party support, Richards found himself leading his ministry into an election that, by most accounts, he had virtually no chance of winning.

Richards spent his nine weeks as Premier attempting to talk up the achievements of his cabinet. However, it was nowhere near enough to save him from defeat at the state election. With three Labor factions—Richards' Parliamentary Labor Party, the official ALP and the Lang Labor Party—splitting the vote, the revitalised opposition in the guise of the Butler-led Liberal and Country League (a merging of Butler's Liberal Federation and the Country Party) won a landslide majority. The three Labor factions won only 13 seats between them

Richards spent the next year working to reunite the ALP and following his success, served as Deputy Leader of the reunited party from 1934 to 1938 under the leadership of Andrew Lacey (prior to this he was the leader of the Parliamentary Labor Party, separated from the executive, although Richards made efforts with Lacey and the other factions to merge the parties into a united front from the turmoil his predecessor had put them in). Following another heavy defeat at the 1938 state election, where more independents were elected to parliament than Labor members, Richards became Labor leader for a second time.

Richards remained opposition leader for 11 years, during which Labor increased its primary vote at three consecutive elections. However, it was unable to dislodge the LCL, now led by Tom Playford, due to the electoral malapportionment known as the Playmander, in which rural votes were worth several times more than votes in Adelaide. He actually led Labor to a 53.3 percent two-party vote at the 1944 election. In most of the rest of Australia, this would have been enough to make him Premier with a solid majority. However, due to the Playmander, Labor was only able to net a five-seat swing in this election, leaving it with 16 seats, four short of victory. By 1949, Richards had suffered the death of his wife and, with the realisation that the current system gave Labor little chance of returning to government, retired from politics to serve as the Commonwealth Government's Administrator of Nauru, taking his new bride with him.

He returned from Nauru to Adelaide in 1951; served as director of radio station 5KA, then under Methodist control; and was appointed to the South Australian government Forestry Board in 1954. Playford, never afraid to make use of opponents' skills for the greater good, also commissioned Richards to investigate issues relating to delinquent children, mining issues and housing.

Death
Afflicted by diabetes, Richards nonetheless lived long enough to see a Labor government returned to South Australia (under the leadership of Premier Frank Walsh) in 1965. He died in Moonta two years later, and received a state funeral.

Family
Richards married Ada Maude Dixon (ca.1883 – 20 July 1948), whose sisters married S. R. Whitford and Oswald Pryor, on 31 January 1914. Their children included two daughters: Joyce and Kathlean.

Notes

References
 Australian Dictionary of Biography
 Election of Andrew Lacey as Leader (Trove)
 Election as Leader (Trove)
   Resignation from Parliament (SA Parliament)

External links

 
 

|-

|-

1885 births
1967 deaths
Premiers of South Australia
Treasurers of South Australia
Members of the South Australian House of Assembly
Australian Labor Party members of the Parliament of South Australia
Australian people of Cornish descent
People from Moonta, South Australia
20th-century Australian politicians
Administrators of Nauru